Rick Leach and Zina Garrison were the defending champions but lost in the second round to Michiel Schapers and Brenda Schultz.

John Fitzgerald and Elizabeth Smylie defeated Jim Pugh and Natasha Zvereva in the final, 7–6(7–4), 6–2 to win the mixed doubles tennis title at the 1991 Wimbledon Championships.

Seeds

  Jim Pugh /  Natasha Zvereva (final)
  John Fitzgerald /  Elizabeth Smylie (champions)
  Scott Davis /  Robin White (first round)
  Rick Leach /  Zina Garrison (second round)
  Patrick Galbraith /  Patty Fendick (first round)
  Glenn Michibata /  Jill Hetherington (quarterfinals)
  David Wheaton /  Mary Joe Fernández (withdrew)
  Grant Connell /  Kathy Rinaldi (semifinals)
  Todd Woodbridge /  Nicole Provis (third round)
  Danie Visser /  Rosalyn Fairbank-Nideffer (second round)
  Ken Flach /  Kathy Jordan (second round)
  Jorge Lozano /  Arantxa Sánchez Vicario (second round)
  Cyril Suk /  Helena Suková (third round)
  Jim Grabb /  Elise Burgin (first round)
  Wayne Ferreira /  Lise Gregory (first round)
  Mark Kratzmann /  Pam Shriver (second round)

Qualifying

Draw

Finals

Top half

Section 1

Section 2

Bottom half

Section 3

Section 4

References

External links

1991 Wimbledon Championships – Doubles draws and results at the International Tennis Federation

X=Mixed Doubles
Wimbledon Championship by year – Mixed doubles
Wimbledon Championships